The following is a list of census subdivisions in the Canadian province of Ontario.

Key
C = City
R = First Nations Reserve
S-E = Indian Settlement
T = Town
TP = Township
UNO = Unorganized
VL = Village

A
Abitibi 70 R
Addington Highlands TP              
Adelaide Metcalfe TP 
Adjala-Tosorontio TP   
Admaston/Bromley TP 
Agency 1 R 
Ajax T
Akwesasne (Part) 59  R                  
Alberton TP 
Alderville First Nation R 
Alfred and Plantagenet TP 
Algoma, Unorganized, North Part UNO 
Algoma, Unorganized, South East Part UNO 
Algonquin Highlands TP
Almonte T
Alnwick/Haldimand TP  			 
Amaranth TP 
Amherstburg T 
The Archipelago TP 
Armour TP 
Armstrong TP 
Arnprior T 
Aroland 83 R 
Arran-Elderslie 
Ashfield-Colborne-Wawanosh TP  
Asphodel-Norwood TP 
Assiginack TP 
Athens TP 
Atikokan TP   
Attawapiskat 91A R 
Augusta TP   
Aurora T 
Aylmer T

B
Baldwin, Ontario TP 
Bancroft, Ontario T 
Barrie, Ontario C 
Bayham, Ontario TP 
Bear Island 1, Ontario  R
Bearskin Lake, Ontario R
Beckwith, Ontario TP 
Belleville, Ontario C 
Big Grassy River 35G, Ontario R 
Big Island Mainland 93, Ontario R 
Billings, Ontario TP 
Black River-Matheson, Ontario TP  
Blandford-Blenheim, Ontario TP 
Blind River, Ontario T 
The Blue Mountains, Ontario T 
Bluewater, Ontario T 
Bonfield, Ontario TP 
Bonnechere Valley, Ontario TP 
Bracebridge, Ontario T 
Bradford West Gwillimbury, Ontario T 
Brampton, Ontario C 
Brant, Ontario C 
Brantford, Ontario C 
Brethour, Ontario TP 
Brighton, Ontario T 
Brock, Ontario TP 
Brockton, Ontario TP 
Brockville, Ontario C  
Brooke-Alvinston, Ontario TP 
Bruce Mines, Ontario T 
Brudenell, Lyndoch and Raglan, Ontario TP 
Burk's Falls, Ontario VL 
Burlington, Ontario C 
Burpee and Mills, Ontario TP

C
Caledon, Ontario T 
Callander, Ontario TP
Calvin, Ontario TP
Cambridge, Ontario C 
Carleton Place, Ontario T 
Carling, Ontario TP 
Carlow/Mayo, Ontario TP 
Casey, Ontario TP 
Casselman, Ontario VL 
Cat Lake 63C, Ontario R
Cavan-Monaghan, Ontario TP 
Central Elgin, Ontario TP 
Central Frontenac, Ontario TP 
Central Huron, Ontario TP 
Central Manitoulin, Ontario TP 
Centre Hastings, Ontario TP 
Centre Wellington, Ontario TP 
Chamberlain, Ontario TP 
Champlain, Ontario TP 
Chapleau, Ontario TP 
Chapleau 74A, Ontario R 
Chapleau 75, Ontario R 
Chapple, Ontario TP 
Charlton and Dack, Ontario TP
Chatham-Kent, Ontario C 
Chatsworth, Ontario TP 
Chippewas of Georgina Island First Nation, Ontario R 
Chippewas of the Thames First Nation 42, Ontario R 
Chisholm, Ontario TP 
Christian Island 30, Ontario R 
Christian Island 30A, Ontario R 
Clarence-Rockland, Ontario C 
Clarington, Ontario T 
Clearview, Ontario TP 
Cobalt, Ontario T 
Cobourg, Ontario T 
Cochrane, Ontario T 
Cochrane, Unorganized, North Part, Ontario UNO 
Cochrane, Unorganized, South East Part, Ontario UNO 
Cochrane, Unorganized, South West Part, Ontario UNO 
Cockburn Island, Ontario TP 
Coleman, Ontario TP 
Collingwood, Ontario T 
Conmee, Ontario TP 
Constance Lake 92, Ontario R 
Cornwall, Ontario C 
Couchiching 16A, Ontario R 
Cramahe, Ontario TP 
Curve Lake First Nation 35, Ontario R

D
The Dalles 38C R
Dawn-Euphemia TP 
Dawson TP 
Deep River T 
Deer Lake R
Deseronto T 
Dokis 9 R 
Dorion TP 
Douro-Dummer TP 
Drummond/North Elmsley TP 
Dryden C 
Dubreuilville TP 
Duck Lake 76B R 
Dutton/Dunwich TP 
Dysart and Others TP

E
Eagle Lake 27, Ontario R
Ear Falls, Ontario TP
East Ferris, Ontario TP 
East Garafraxa, Ontario TP   
East Gwillimbury, Ontario T 
East Hawkesbury, Ontario TP 
East Luther Grand Valley, Ontario TP 
East Zorra-Tavistock, Ontario TP 
Edwardsburgh/Cardinal, Ontario TP 
Elizabethtown-Kitley, Ontario TP  
Elliot Lake C 
Emo, Ontario TP 
Englehart, Ontario T 
English River 21, Ontario R 
Enniskillen, Ontario TP 
Erin, Ontario T 
Espanola, Ontario T 
Essa, Ontario TP 
Essex, Ontario T 
Evanturel, Ontario TP

F
Factory Island 1, Ontario R
Faraday, Ontario TP 
Fauquier-Strickland, Ontario TP  
Flying Post 73, Ontario R 
Fort Albany (Part) 67, Ontario R 
Fort Erie, Ontario T 
Fort Frances, Ontario T 
Fort Hope 64, Ontario R 
Fort Severn 89, Ontario R 
Fort William 52, Ontario R 
French River T 
French River 13, Ontario R 
Front of Yonge, Ontario TP 
Frontenac Islands, Ontario TP

G
Gananoque T   
Garden River R
Gauthier TP 
Georgian Bay TP 
Georgian Bluffs TP 
Georgina T 
Gillies TP 
Ginoogaming First Nation R 
Goderich T 
Gordon/Barrie Island TP 
Gore Bay T 
Goulais Bay R 
Gravenhurst T 
Greater Madawaska TP 
Greater Napanee T 
Greater Sudbury C 
Greenstone T 
Grey Highlands TP 
Grimsby T 
Gros Cap R 
Guelph C 
Guelph/Eramosa TP 
Gull River R

H
Haldimand, Ontario C 
Halton Hills, Ontario T 
Hamilton, Ontario C 
Hamilton, Ontario (township) TP 
Hanover, Ontario T
Harley, Ontario TP 
Harris, Ontario TP 
Hastings Highlands, Ontario TP 
Havelock-Belmont-Methuen, Ontario TP 
Hawkesbury, Ontario T 
Head, Clara and Maria, Ontario TP 
Hearst, Ontario T 
Henvey Inlet 2, Ontario R 
Hiawatha First Nation R 
Highlands East, Ontario TP 
Hilliard, Ontario TP 
Hilton, Ontario TP 
Hilton Beach, Ontario VL 
Hornepayne, Ontario TP 
Horton, Ontario TP 
Howick, Ontario TP 
Hudson, Ontario TP 
Huntsville, Ontario T 
Huron East, Ontario T 
Huron Shores, Ontario TP 
Huron-Kinloss, Ontario TP

I
Ignace, Ontario TP 
Ingersoll, Ontario T 
Innisfil, Ontario T 
Iroquois Falls, Ontario T 
Islington 29, Ontario R

J
James, Ontario TP 
Jocelyn, Ontario TP 
Johnson, Ontario TP 
Joly, Ontario TP

K
Kapuskasing, Ontario T 
Kasabonika Lake, Ontario R
Kawartha Lakes, Ontario C 
Kearney, Ontario T 
Keewaywin, Ontario R 
Kenora, Ontario C 
Kenora 38B, Ontario R 
Kenora, Unorganized, Ontario UNO 
Kerns, Ontario TP 
Kettle Point 44, Ontario R 
Killaloe, Hagarty and Richards, Ontario TP 
Killarney, Ontario T 
Kincardine, Ontario TP 
King, Ontario TP 
Kingfisher Lake 1, Ontario R 
Kingston, Ontario C 
Kingsville, Ontario T 
Kirkland Lake, Ontario T 
Kitchener, Ontario C 
Kitchenuhmaykoosib Aaki 84 (Big Trout Lake), Ontario R

L
La Vallee, Ontario TP 
LaSalle, Ontario T 
Lac Seul 28, Ontario R
Lac des Mille Lacs 22A1, Ontario R 
Laird, Ontario TP 
Lake Helen 53A, Ontario R 
Lake of Bays, Ontario TP 
Lake of the Woods, Ontario TP 
Lake of the Woods 31G, Ontario R 
Lake of the Woods 37, Ontario R 
Lakeshore, Ontario T 
Lambton Shores, Ontario C 
Lanark Highlands, Ontario TP 
Lansdowne House, Ontario S-E 
Larder Lake, Ontario TP 
Latchford, Ontario T 
Laurentian Hills, Ontario T 
Laurentian Valley, Ontario TP 
Leamington, Ontario T 
Leeds and the Thousand Islands, Ontario TP 
Limerick, Ontario TP 
Lincoln, Ontario T 
London, Ontario C 
Long Lake 58, Ontario R 
Long Sault 12, Ontario R 
Loyalist, Ontario TP 
Lucan Biddulph, Ontario TP

M
M'Chigeeng 22 (West Bay 22), Ontario R
MacDowell Lake, Ontario S-E 
Macdonald, Meredith and Aberdeen Additional, Ontario TP 
Machar, Ontario TP 
Machin, Ontario TP 
Madawaska Valley, Ontario TP 
Madoc, Ontario TP 
Magnetawan, Ontario TP 
Magnetawan 1, Ontario R 
Malahide, Ontario TP 
Manitou Rapids 11, Ontario R 
Manitoulin, Unorganized, Mainland, Ontario UNO 
Manitoulin, Unorganized, West Part, Ontario UNO 
Manitouwadge, Ontario TP 
Mapleton, Ontario TP 
Marathon, Ontario T 
Markham, Ontario T 
Markstay-Warren, Ontario T   
Marmora and Lake, Ontario TP 
Marten Falls 65, Ontario R 
Matachewan, Ontario TP 
Matachewan 72, Ontario R 
Mattagami 71, Ontario R 
Mattawa, Ontario T 
Mattawan, Ontario TP 
Mattice-Val Côté, Ontario TP 
McDougall, Ontario TP 
McGarry, Ontario TP 
McKellar, Ontario TP
McMurrich/Monteith, Ontario TP 
McNab/Braeside, Ontario TP 
Meaford, Ontario T
Melancthon, Ontario TP 
Merrickville-Wolford, Ontario VL 
Middlesex Centre, Ontario TP 
Midland, Ontario T 
Milton, Ontario T 
Minden Hills, Ontario TP 
Minto, Ontario T 
Missanabie 62, Ontario R 
Mississagi River 8, Ontario R 
Mississauga, Ontario C 
Mississaugas of Scugog Island, Ontario R 
Mnjikaning First Nation 32 (Rama First Nation 32), Ontario R 
Mono, Ontario T 
Montague, Ontario TP 
Moonbeam, Ontario TP 
Moose Factory 68, Ontario R 
Moose Point 79, Ontario R 
Moosonee, Ontario T 
Moravian 47, Ontario R 
Morley, Ontario TP 
Morris-Turnberry, Ontario TP 
Mountbatten 76A, Ontario R 
Mulmur, Ontario TP 
Munsee-Delaware Nation 1, Ontario R 
Muskoka Lakes, Ontario TP 
Muskrat Dam Lake, Ontario R

N
Nairn and Hyman, Ontario TP 
Naiscoutaing 17A, Ontario R
The Nation TP 
Neebing, Ontario TP 
Neguaguon Lake 25D, Ontario R 
Neskantaga, Ontario R 
New Credit (Part) 40A, Ontario R 
New Post 69, Ontario R 
New Post 69A, Ontario R 
New Tecumseth, Ontario T   
Newbury, Ontario VL 
Newmarket, Ontario T 
Neyaashiinigmiing, Ontario R 
Niagara Falls, Ontario C 
Niagara-on-the-Lake, Ontario T 
Nipigon, Ontario TP 
Nipissing, Ontario TP 
Nipissing 10, Ontario R 
Nipissing, Unorganized, North Part, Ontario UNO 
Nipissing, Unorganized, South Part, Ontario UNO 
Norfolk, Ontario C 
North Algona-Wilberforce, Ontario TP 
North Bay, Ontario C 
North Dumfries, Ontario TP 
North Dundas, Ontario TP 
North Frontenac, Ontario TP 
North Glengarry, Ontario TP 
North Grenville, Ontario TP 
North Huron, Ontario TP 
North Kawartha, Ontario TP 
North Middlesex, Ontario TP 
North Perth, Ontario T 
North Shore, Ontario TP 
North Spirit Lake, Ontario R 
North Stormont, Ontario TP 
Northeastern Manitoulin and the Islands, Ontario T 
Northern Bruce Peninsula, Ontario TP
Northwest Angle 33B, Ontario R 
Norwich, Ontario TP

O
O'Connor, Ontario TP 
Oakville, Ontario T 
Oil Springs, Ontario VL 
Ojibway Nation of Saugeen (Savant Lake), Ontario R
Oliver Paipoonge, Ontario TP 
Oneida 41, Ontario R 
Opasatika, Ontario TP 
Orangeville, Ontario T 
Orillia, Ontario C 
Oro-Medonte, Ontario TP 
Oshawa, Ontario C 
Osnaburgh 63A, Ontario R 
Osnaburgh 63B, Ontario R 
Otonabee-South Monaghan, Ontario TP 
Ottawa, Ontario C 
Owen Sound, Ontario C

P
Pakenham, Ontario VL
Papineau-Cameron, Ontario TP 
Parry Island First Nation, Ontario R
Parry Sound, Ontario T 
Parry Sound, Unorganized, Centre Part, Ontario UNO 
Parry Sound, Unorganized, North East Part, Ontario UNO 
Pays Plat 51, Ontario R 
Peawanuck, Ontario S-E 
Pelee, Ontario TP 
Pelham, Ontario T 
Pembroke, Ontario C 
Penetanguishene, Ontario T 
Perry, Ontario TP 
Perth, Ontario T 
Perth East, Ontario TP 
Perth South, Ontario TP   
Petawawa, Ontario T 
Peterborough, Ontario C 
Petrolia, Ontario T 
Pic Mobert North, Ontario R 
Pic Mobert South, Ontario R 
Pic River 50, Ontario R 
Pickering, Ontario C 
Pickle Lake, Ontario TP 
Pikangikum 14, Ontario R 
Pikwakanagan (Golden Lake 39), Ontario R 
Plummer Additional, Ontario TP 
Plympton-Wyoming, Ontario T 
Point Edward, Ontario VL 
Poplar Hill, Ontario R 
Port Colborne, Ontario C 
Port Hope, Ontario T 
Powassan, Ontario T 
Prescott, Ontario T 
Prince, Ontario TP 
Prince Edward, Ontario C 
Puslinch, Ontario TP

Q
Quinte West, Ontario C

R
Rainy Lake 17A, Ontario R
Rainy Lake 17B, Ontario R 
Rainy Lake 18C, Ontario R 
Rainy Lake 26A, Ontario R 
Rainy River, Ontario T 
Rainy River, Unorganized, Ontario UNO 
Ramara, Ontario TP 
Rankin Location 15D, Ontario R 
Rat Portage 38A, Ontario R 
Red Lake, Ontario T 
Red Rock, Ontario TP 
Renfrew, Ontario T 
Richmond Hill, Ontario T 
Rideau Lakes, Ontario TP 
Rocky Bay 1, Ontario R 
Russell, Ontario TP 
Ryerson, Ontario TP

S
Sabaskong Bay 35D, Ontario R
Sables-Spanish Rivers, Ontario TP 
Sachigo Lake 1, Ontario R 
Sachigo Lake 2, Ontario R 
Sagamok, Ontario R 
Sandy Lake 88, Ontario R 
Sarnia, Ontario C 
Sarnia 45, Ontario R 
Saug-a-Gaw-Sing 1, Ontario R 
Saugeen 29, Ontario R 
Saugeen Shores, Ontario T 
Sault Ste. Marie, Ontario C 
Schreiber, Ontario TP 
Scugog, Ontario TP 
Seguin, Ontario TP 
Seine River 22A2, Ontario R 
Seine River 23A, Ontario R 
Seine River 23B, Ontario R 
Selwyn, Ontario TP 
Serpent River 7, Ontario R 
Severn, Ontario TP 
Shawanaga 17, Ontario R 
Sheguiandah 24, Ontario R 
Shelburne, Ontario T   
Sheshegwaning 20, Ontario R 
Shoal Lake (Part) 39A, Ontario R 
Shoal Lake (Part) 40, Ontario R 
Shoal Lake 34B2, Ontario R 
Shuniah, Ontario TP 
Sioux Lookout, Ontario T 
Sioux Narrows-Nestor Falls, Ontario TP 
Six Nations 40, Ontario R 
Slate Falls, Ontario S-E 
Smiths Falls, Ontario T 
Smooth Rock Falls, Ontario T 
South Algonquin, Ontario TP 
South Bruce, Ontario TP 
South Bruce Peninsula, Ontario T 
South Dundas, Ontario TP 
South Frontenac, Ontario TP 
South Glengarry, Ontario TP 
South Huron, Ontario T 
South River, Ontario VL 
South Stormont, Ontario TP 
South-West Oxford, Ontario TP 
Southgate, Ontario TP 
Southwest Middlesex, Ontario TP 
Southwold, Ontario TP
Spanish, Ontario T
Springwater, Ontario TP 
St. Catharines, Ontario C 
St. Clair, Ontario TP 
St. Joseph, Ontario TP 
St. Marys, Ontario T 
St. Thomas, Ontario C 
St.-Charles, Ontario T 
Stirling-Rawdon, Ontario TP 
Stone Mills, Ontario TP 
Stratford, Ontario C 
Strathroy-Caradoc, Ontario TP 
Strong, Ontario TP 
Sucker Creek 23, Ontario R 
Sudbury, Unorganized, North Part, Ontario UNO 
Summer Beaver, Ontario S-E  
Sundridge, Ontario VL

T
Tarbutt TP 
Tay TP 
Tay Valley TP
Tecumseh T 
Tehkummah TP 
Temagami T 
Temiskaming Shores C 
Terrace Bay TP 
Thames Centre TP 
Thessalon T   
Thessalon 12 R 
Thornloe VL 
Thorold C 
Thunder Bay C 
Thunder Bay, Unorganized UNO 
Tillsonburg T 
Timiskaming, Unorganized, East Part UNO 
Timiskaming, Unorganized, West Part UNO 
Timmins C 
Tiny TP 
Toronto C 
Trent Hills T
Trent Lakes TP
Tudor and Cashel TP 
Tweed TP 
Tyendinaga TP 
Tyendinaga Mohawk Territory R

U
Uxbridge, Ontario TP

V
Val Rita-Harty, Ontario TP 
Vaughan, Ontario C

W
Wabauskang 21, Ontario R
Wabigoon Lake 27, Ontario R 
Wanapitei 11, Ontario R 
Wahta Mohawk Territory, Ontario R 
Wainfleet, Ontario TP 
Walpole Island 46, Ontario R 
Wapekeka 1, Ontario R 
Wapekeka 2, Ontario R 
Warwick, Ontario TP 
Wasaga Beach, Ontario T 
Waterloo, Ontario C 
Wawa, Ontario TP
Wawakapewin (Long Dog Lake), Ontario R 
Weagamow Lake 87, Ontario R 
Webequie, Ontario S-E 
Welland, Ontario C 
Wellesley, Ontario TP 
Wellington North, Ontario TP 
West Elgin, Ontario TP 
West Grey, Ontario TP 
West Lincoln, Ontario TP 
West Nipissing, Ontario T 
West Perth, Ontario TP 
Westport, Ontario VL 
Whitby, Ontario T 
Whitchurch–Stouffville, Ontario T 
White River, Ontario TP 
Whitefish Bay 32A, Ontario  R
Whitefish Bay 33A, Ontario R 
Whitefish Bay 34A, Ontario R 
Whitefish Lake 6, Ontario R 
Whitefish River (Part) 4, Ontario R 
Whitesand, Ontario  R 
Whitestone, Ontario TP 
Whitewater Region, Ontario TP 
Wikwemikong Unceded 26, Ontario R 
Wilmot, Ontario TP 
Windsor, Ontario C 
Wollaston, Ontario TP 
Woodstock, Ontario C 
Woolwich, Ontario TP 
Wunnumin 1, Ontario R 
Wunnumin 2, Ontario

Z
Zhiibaahaasing 19 (Cockburn Island 19), Ontario R
Zhiibaahaasing 19A (Cockburn Island 19A), Ontario R 
Zorra, Ontario TP

Census